Online advertising in China benefited from the soaring value of China’s internet media. The market size of China’s online advertising industry in 2009 reached 20.61 billion Chinese yuan, up 21.2% from 2008. Search engine, portals, networks, videos, online communities, and vertical site advertising are the six main categories in China's online advertising. Among these, search engine advertising is one of the most preferred forms.

Internet users
According to Internet World Stats, China's online shopping population reached 8% of the total Chinese population in 2009, and the number of internet users in China reached 485 million in June 2011. They spend 1 billion hours online each day and the number will double to 2 billion by 2015. China's online shopping population is estimated to increase to 19% of the total population by 2012.

Search Engine Advertising
The key players in China's search engine advertising are Tencent, Soso, Baidu, Sogou, Google, Bing and Yahoo! China. After Google decided to pull its search engine out of the Chinese market in early 2010, Tencent became the top choice for search engine advertising in China. Tencent's advertising platform is in Chinese.

Video advertising

There are several companies that provide video advertising services in China.
Advertising content is shown before video or during pause. Leading companies in the video advertising industry include Tencent Video, YouKu/TuDou (merged), PPS.tv and Funshion.

References 

China
Advertising
Advertising in China